The second round of the women's individual pursuit during the fourth round of the 2011–12 UCI Track Cycling World Cup took place in London, United Kingdom on 18 February 2012 and was part of the London Prepares series. 22 Athletes participated in the contest.

Competition format
The women's individual pursuit consists of a 3 km time trial race between two riders, starting on opposite sides of the track.  If one rider catches the other, the race is over.

The tournament consisted of an initial qualifying round.  The top two riders in the qualifying round advanced to the gold medal match and the third and fourth riders advanced to the bronze medal race.

Schedule
Saturday 18 February
09:00-10:06 Qualifying
20:00-20:15 Finals
20:19-20:26 Victory Ceremony

Schedule from Tissottiming.com

Results

Qualifying

Results from Tissottiming.com.

Finals

Final bronze medal race

Final gold medal race

Results from Tissottiming.com.

References

London Prepares series
UCI Track Cycling World Cup – Women's individual pursuit
2011–12 UCI Track Cycling World Cup